Vataman or Vataman Chowkdi is a small village in the western state of Gujarat in India, located at a crossroads about an hour and a half from Ahmedabad or Amdavad airport on the road to Palitana. Vataman is famous for its Jain derasar. Vataman village is famous for guava fruit many cast of people live in vataman like rajput, garasiya, Koli patel, bharavad, etc. The cast of Rajputs are Barad, Dabhi, Rathod, Parmar, Chavda, etc.
The cast of Garasiya Rajputs are Gohil, Zala Jadeja. Vataman village is also famous for temples like Ranmukteshwar Mahadev temple, Swaminarayan temple, Ramji Mandir, Laghurajswami temple, Bhathavali Meldi Maa temple etc. and Khedut Bazar mini mall(agro) also situated at Vataman Chowkadi by Hathisang Bhikhubha Barad and Barad Krupalsinh Hathisang.

Demographics 
In the 2001 India census, the village of Vataman had 5,906 inhabitants, 51.9% (3,067) male and 48.1% (2,839) female, for a gender ratio of 926 females per thousand males.

Jain Temple
This Jain temple is dedicated to the Bhagwan (Lord) Adinath or Rishabha that was consecrated with great fanfare and devotion by Anilaben and Sureshbhai Bapalalbhai Shah of Palanpur and Mumbai in April 2003. The main temple also houses statues of Rishabhanatha, Mahavira swami, Parshvanath swami, Vasupujya swami and Kunthunath swami.

Notes

Jain temples in Gujarat
Villages in Ahmedabad district
Religious buildings and structures completed in 2003
2003 establishments in Gujarat
Māru-Gurjara architecture
Settlements in Gujarat